The First Secretary of the Dagestan regional branch of the Communist Party of the Soviet Union was the position of highest authority in the Dagestan ASSR in the Russian SFSR of the Soviet Union. The position was created on February 16, 1919, and abolished in August 1991. The First Secretary was a de facto appointed position usually by the Politburo or the General Secretary himself.

List of First Secretaries of the Communist Party of Dagestan

See also
Dagestan Autonomous Soviet Socialist Republic

Notes

Sources
 World Statesmen.org

Regional Committees of the Communist Party of the Soviet Union
Politics of Dagestan
1919 establishments in Russia
1991 disestablishments in the Soviet Union